François Champagne de Labriolle (17 February 1926 - 11 October 2019), was a French agrégé de grammaire and doctor in slavistics.

De Labriolle is an honorary professor of Russian language and literature at the Institut national des langues et civilisations orientales, of which he was vice president (1971–1986) then president (1986–1993). He has written and published on Russian literature and the Baltic republics (Estonia, Latvia, Lithuania)..

He is the son of Pierre de Labriolle, a professor at the Sorbonne, a member of the Institut de France, and father of French diplomat Jacques Champagne de Labriolle, graduated in Bantu languages from INALCO.

Bibliography 
1971: I. A. Krylov, les œuvres de jeunesse et les courants littéraires 
1987: L’échec dans l’œuvre d’Ivan Goncharov, Éditions Mouton 
1974: Le secret des trois cartes dans La Dame de pique de Pushkin, Canadian Slavonic Papers
1974: Grammaire russe de base, with Natalie Stepanoff-Kontchalovski, Éditeurs réunis
1999: La Lettonie (with Suzanne Champonnois), Éditions Karthala
2004: Estoniens, Lettons, Lituaniens : histoire et destins (with Suzanne Champonnois), Éditions Armeline, 2004 
1997: L'Estonie : des Estes aux Estoniens (with Suzanne Champonnois), Éditions Karthala, coll. "Méridiens", 285 p. + 8 p. illustrations 
2001: Dictionnaire historique de la Lituanie (with Suzanne Champonnois), Brest, Éditions Armeline, 2001 
2003: Dictionnaire historique de la Lettonie (with Suzanne Champonnois), Brest, Éditions Armeline, 
2005: Dictionnaire historique de l'Estonie (with Suzanne Champonnois), Brest, Éditions Armeline, 313 p. 
2007: La Lituanie : un millénaire d'histoire (with Suzanne Champonnois), Éditions L'Harmattan,

References

External links 
 François de Labriolle on data.bnf.fr
 Oblomov n'est-il qu'un paresseux ? on Persée 

Slavists
1926 births
2019 deaths